Maskelyne is a solitary lunar impact crater that lies in the southeast part of the Mare Tranquillitatis. Its diameter is 22 km. It was named after British astronomer Nevil Maskelyne. The outer rim has a somewhat polygonal shape, although it is generally circular. The inner walls are terraced and there is a low central rise at the midpoint of the floor.

The landing site of the Apollo 11 expedition is located about 250 kilometers to the west-southwest.  To the northeast are Wallach and Aryabhata. To the southeast is the bright Censorinus.  To the south are the lunar mountains informally known as Duke Island and Boot Hill.  There are sinuous rilles southwest and west of Maskelyne - these were informally named Sidewinder and Diamondback by the Apollo 10 crew and referred to as such by later missions, especially Apollo 11.

Satellite craters

By convention these features are identified on lunar maps by placing the letter on the side of the crater midpoint that is closest to Maskelyne.

The following craters have been renamed by the IAU.
 Maskelyne E — See Aryabhata (crater).
 Maskelyne H — See Wallach (crater).

References

External links

 LTO-61D4 Maskelyne Orientalis, Lunar Topographic Orthophotomap (LTO) Series
 Location of Maskelyne Crater in Google Moon
 Lunar Orbiter 2 frame 5 showing part of Maskelyne F

Impact craters on the Moon